On 11 February 2023, blasphemy suspect Waris was lynched in Nankana Sahib District, Pakistan.

Background

Blasphemy is a very serious crime in Pakistan, for which the maximum penalty is death. Pakistan has sentenced people convicted of blasphemy to death, although it has not executed any of them. Some people who were accused of blasphemy have been lynched, including Priyantha Kumara in Sialkot, Punjab, in 2021 and Mushtaq Ahmed in Tulamba, Punjab, in 2022. International and national human rights groups say that blasphemy accusations have often been used to intimidate religious minorities. In 2021, a mob burned down Mandani police station in Tangi Tehsil, Charsadda District, Peshawar Division, Khyber Pakhtunkhwa, intending to kill a blasphemy suspect who was being held there.

Lynching
In 2019, a man named Waris was arrested for blasphemy. He remained in prison until mid-2022. On 11 February 2023 he was accused of desecrating a copy of the Quran. Some people reacted by attacking him. The police arrested Waris in Nankana Sahib District in Lahore Division, Punjab, and took him to Warburton police station. Later that day, a mob of hundreds stormed the police station and killed him, saying that they were punishing him for insulting the Quran.

References

2023 in Punjab, Pakistan
2023 murders in Pakistan
2020s crimes in Punjab, Pakistan
Attacks on buildings and structures in Punjab, Pakistan
Blasphemy
February 2023 crimes in Asia
February 2023 events in Pakistan
Lynching deaths in Pakistan
Murder in Punjab, Pakistan
Nankana Sahib District